Sean Monaghan (born May 21, 1981) is an American professional boxer of Irish descent competing in the light-heavyweight division.

Background

Before he was a professional boxer, he had a job as a bricklayer. His parents are from County Meath, Ireland.

Amateur career
Monaghan had about 15 amateur fights.

Before deciding to join the pro ranks, Monaghan competed in the 2009 New York Golden Gloves competition, losing at the final on points to Joe Smith Jr., at Madison Square Garden.

Professional career

Monaghan vs. Trigueno 
Monaghan made his professional debut in his hometown. He faced Simeon Trigueno. A body shot sent Trigueno down to a knee for an eight count. He beat the count but was dropped again by a straight right hand to the head and was saved by the bell to end the round. The ringside doctor put an end to the bout citing an injury. Monaghan was credited with a first round TKO.

Monaghan vs. Pietrantonio 
Monaghan scored a fifth round TKO over Anthony Pietrantonio in the Garden's WaMu Theatre on October 22, 2011.

Monaghan vs. Johnson 
On June 14 in front of a capacity crowd at NY's Roseland Ballroom, Monaghan became the new WBC Continental Americas Light Heavyweight Champion with an 8th round TKO over Romaro Johnson

Monaghan has been working on sharpening his technique with greater emphasis on speed, head movement and combination work as opposed to merely looking to land the devastating kill shot, although he still possesses a keen ability to score knockouts.

Monaghan vs. Cantrell 
Monaghan appeared on the undercard of the WBO featherweight championship fight between Orlando Salido and challenger Mikey Garcia at Madison Square Garden Theater on January 19, 2013 where he defeated Roger Cantrell by unanimous decision in an eight-round fight.

Monaghan vs. Stanley 
On the April 13th Donaire-Rigondeaux undercard at The Radio City Music Hall Monaghan scored a first-round knockout of journeyman Dion Stanley (overhand right). This knockout propelled his career - convincing Top Rank Boxing's Bob Arum to sign the popular fighter.

Monaghan vs. Barrera 
Monaghan was defeated by Sullivan Barrera via unanimous decision in their 10 round contest on 3rd November, 2018. The scorecards were announced as 99-91, 99-91, 98-92 in favor of Barrera.

Monaghan vs. Johnson 
In his next bout, Monaghan faced Callum Johnson, ranked #15 by the IBF at light heavyweight. Johnson beat Monaghan by technical knockout in the 3rd round.

Professional boxing record

References

External links
 
 Sean Monaghan - Profile, News Archive & Current Rankings at Box.Live

1981 births
Living people
American male boxers
Light-heavyweight boxers
American people of Irish descent